David Bowman (December 8, 1957 – February 27, 2012) is an American writer. He published two novels and one book of music criticism before his death in 2012, at age 54. A third novel, Big Bang, was published on January 15, 2019, by Little, Brown and Company. Bowman also wrote for Salon.

Books
His first novel, Let the Dog Drive, was a 1993 New York Times Notable Book. It also won the Elmer Holmes Bobst Award for Emerging Writers.

Bunny Modern, his second novel, was published in 1998; SPIN called it "lively, whacked-out, [and] often surprisingly moving."

Bowman's only work of nonfiction, This Must Be the Place: The Adventures of the Talking Heads in the 20th Century, about Talking Heads, came out in 2001.

Big Bang, Bowman's posthumous novel, received critical acclaim.

References

Further reading

1957 births
2012 deaths
20th-century American male writers
20th-century American novelists
21st-century American non-fiction writers
21st-century American male writers
American male novelists